Serbian Carpathians is a mountain range in eastern Central Serbia, located in Central Europe. It presents an extension of proper Carpathian Mountains across the Danube, connecting them with the Balkan Mountains in the southeast. They stretch in north-south direction in eastern Serbia, east of the Great Morava valley and west of the White Timok Valley and north of the Nišava Valley. The mountains are 800–1500 m high, and dominated by karst limestone geologic features, the highest one being Rtanj Mountain (1,565 m).

Definitions
Under the strict definition (as defined by the Serbian Academy of Sciences and Arts and adopted by the Carpathian Convention), Serbian part of the Carpathian Mountains covers only 732 km², or less than 1% of the total Carpathian area. That part encompasses the southern bank of the Iron Gate and the area of Đerdap National Park. It covers northern rims of northern Kučaj, Šomrda, Liskovac, Veliki Greben and Miroč mountains, in municipalities of Golubac, Majdanpek and Kladovo

However, in Serbian geography, the epithet "Carpathian" is traditionally also given to the whole northern part of the Carpatho-Balkan arc, which connects the Carpathians proper with the Balkan Mountains. It refers to the following mountains:

Šomrda
Liškovac
Veliki Greben
Miroč
Homolje Mountains
Veliki Krš
Mali Krš
Stol
Deli Jovan
Beljanica
Kučaj Mountains
Rtanj
Tupižnica
Devica
Ozren

There are incentives to incorporate the whole wider Serbian Carpathian region into the framework of the Carpathian Convention. Serbia ratified the Convention in November 2007.

Geology

The entire part of Serbia east of the Great and South Morava rivers is referred to as "Carpatho-Balkan arc" in geotectonic terminology. The region is composed of rocks of Proterozoic to Quaternary age. Limestones and dolomites (in a lesser extent) of Jurassic (J2, J3) and Lower Cretaceous (K1+2, K3+4) age whose thickness can be more than 1,000 m. The structures are generally oriented in north-south direction, which bend on northern and southern parts, forming a C-shaped arc.

Though those mountains are related to the Carpathians from the geological point of view, they have been included to them by the scientists only at the end of the 20th century. In the past, those mountains were included by mistake to the Balkan mountains.

Demographics
Eastern Serbia is one of the most sparsely populated areas of the Balkans. A large portion of the population is engaged in nomadic sheep-breeding. The population is mixed of Serbs and Romanians. It is underdeveloped, with sparse infrastructure and long distances between towns. The region is subject to further depopulation: between censuses of 1991 and 2002, municipalities of Bor and Majdanpek lost 3,500 residents each, Negotin lost 5,500, Zaječar lost 5,000, and Knjaževac 6,500.

See also 
 List of mountains in Serbia

References

External links
 Carpatho-Balkan Geomorphological Commission

 
Mountain ranges of Serbia
Mountain ranges of the Carpathians
Geographical regions of Serbia